C. heathi may refer to:
 Camponotus heathi, Mann, 1916, an ant species in the genus Camponotus
 Candalides heathi, a butterfly species in the genus Candalides found in  Australia
 Crematogaster heathi, Mann, 1916, an ant species in the genus Crematogaster

Subspecies
 Candalides heathi heathi, Cox, 1873, a subspecies in the butterfly species Candalides heathi

See also
 Heathi (disambiguation)